Neal M. Ashkanasy  (born 5 June 1945) is an Australian academic best known for his work on emotions in the workplace. He was honored for his "service to tertiary education, to psychology and to the community." He began his career as a civil engineer but is now a Professor of Management at the University of Queensland Business School.

Early life and education 
Ashkanasy was born in Melbourne, Australia to Maurice Ashkanasy, an early leader of the Australian Jewish community, and Heather Helen Ashkanasy. He attended Mt. Scopus College and Monash University, where he completed a degree in Civil Engineering in 1966.  In 1968, he completed a master's degree in Water Engineering at the University of New South Wales in Sydney, Australia.

Ashkanasy returned to university in 1970, where he completed a Graduate Diploma in Computer Science and a Bachelor of Arts (major in psychology) with First Class Honours and a University Medal, at the University of Queensland in Brisbane. He enrolled in a PhD in the UQ School of Psychology, which he completed in 1989.

Career
Ashkanasy started work in Brisbane, Australia in 1968 with the Queensland Irrigation and Water Supply Commission and worked for the Commission (renamed the QWRC: the Queensland Water Resources Commission) for 18 years.  He began his career as a construction engineer on Fairbairn Dam in Central Queensland, returning to the Brisbane Office of the QWRC in 1970, rising to the rank of Executive Engineer, Water Supply Investigations.  In this role, he oversaw hydrological investigations for the Wivenhoe Dam is on the Brisbane River in Australia.  During that time, he was also actively involved in the Institution of Engineers, Australia, eventually serving as Chair of its National Committee on Hydrology and Water Resources, during which time he oversaw production of the third edition of Australian Rainfall and Runoff.  In 1975, he undertook a Churchill Fellowship world tour to study water resources development in the USA, Europe, Israel, and India.

Commencing his academic career in 1986 with the School of Psychology, Ashkanasy was later seconded to the UQ Technology and Innovation Management Centre (1989). In 1988, he was appointed a Lecturer (Assistant Professor) in the UQ School of Commerce, where he attained tenure and promotion in 1994 before moving to the (former) School of Management in 1995. In 2002, the schools of Commerce and Management merged to form the UQ Business School. From 2004–2008, he served as Associate Dean (Research) of the Faculty of Business, Economics, and Law.  His present position is Professor of Management in the UQ Business School.

Ashkanasy is the founder of the "Emonet" (the Emotions network) and "Orgcult" (Organizational Culture) Listservs, which are sponsored by the Academy of Management.  The Emonet group sponsors the biannual "International Conference on Emotions and Worklife" which has been running since 1998. The 10th "Emonet Conference" was held in Rome in July 2016.

Publications 
Ashkanasy has published over 300 journal articles and book chapters and is author or co-author of over 300 conference papers.  His research interests include emotions in the workplace, leadership and leader-member relations, organizational and national culture, and ethics in organizational behavior.

According to Google Scholar, his work has been cited more than 33,000 times.

Ashkanasy served from 2007 to 2014 as editor-in-chief of the Journal of Organizational Behavior. From 2004 to 2008, he was associate editor of the Academy of Management Learning and Education. From 2011 to 2014, he served as associate editor of the Academy of Management Review. He is currently a member of the editorial board of Emotion Review (action editor) and book series editor of Research on Emotion in Organizations, published by Emerald Group Publishing.

Awards and honours 
Ashkanasy received a Medal of the Order of Australia (OAM) in 2017 "for service to tertiary education, to psychology, and to the community".

 Fellow of the Academy of Social Sciences.
 Fellow of the Academy of the Social Sciences in Australia.
 Fellow of the Society for Industrial and Organizational Psychology.
 Fellow of the Association for Psychological Science.
 Life Fellow of the Australia and New Zealand Academy of Management.
 Fellow of the British Academy of Management.
 Fellow of the Southern Management Association.
 Awarded the Elton Mayo award for excellence in teaching and research by the Australian Psychological Society.
 Fellow of the Queensland Academy of Arts and Sciences (Council Member).
 Churchill Fellow in the field of water resource development.

References

External links
 Official website

Living people
Organizational psychologists
Australian business theorists
1945 births
Australian Jews
Recipients of the Medal of the Order of Australia
Australian civil engineers
Academic staff of the University of Queensland
Fellows of the Academy of the Social Sciences in Australia